Alnwick Castle is a castle and country house in Alnwick in the English county of Northumberland. It is the seat of the 12th Duke of Northumberland, built following the Norman conquest and renovated and remodelled a number of times. It is a Grade I listed building now the home of Ralph Percy, 12th Duke of Northumberland and his family. In 2016, the castle received over 600,000 visitors per year when combined with adjacent attraction the Alnwick Garden.

History

Alnwick Castle guards a road crossing the River Aln. Ivo de Vesci, Baron of Alnwick, erected the first parts of the castle in about 1096. Beatrix de Vesci, the daughter of Yves de Vescy, married the Constable of Chestershire and Knaresborough, Eustace fitz John. By his marriage to Beatrix de Vesci he gained the baronies of Malton and Alnwick. The castle was first mentioned in 1136 when it was captured by King David I of Scotland. At this point it was described as "very strong". It was besieged in 1172 and again in 1174 by William the Lion, King of Scotland and William was captured outside the walls during the Battle of Alnwick. Eustace de Vesci, lord of Alnwick, was accused of plotting with Robert Fitzwalter against King John in 1212. In response, John ordered the demolition of Alnwick Castle and the demolition of Fitzwalter's stronghold, Baynard's Castle, though his instructions were not carried out at Alnwick.

The castle had been founded in the late 11th century by Ivo de Vesci, a Norman nobleman from Vassy, Calvados in Normandy. A descendant of Ivo de Vesci, John de Vesci, succeeded to his father's titles and estates upon his father's death in Gascony in 1253. These included the barony of Alnwick and a large property in Northumberland and considerable estates in Yorkshire, including Malton. As John was underage, King Henry III of England conferred the wardship of his estates to a foreign kinsman, which caused great offence to the de Vesci family. The family's property and estates had been put into the guardianship of Antony Bek, who sold them to the Percys. From this time the fortunes of the Percys, though they still held their Yorkshire lands and titles, were linked permanently with Alnwick and its castle and have been owned by the Percy family, the earls and later dukes of Northumberland since. The stone castle Henry Percy bought was a modest affair, but he immediately began rebuilding. Though he did not live to see its completion, the construction programme turned Alnwick into a major fortress along the Anglo-Scottish border. His son, also called Henry (1299–1352), continued the building. The Abbot's Tower, the Middle Gateway and the Constable's Tower survive from this period. The work at Alnwick Castle balanced military requirements with the family's residential needs. It set the template for castle renovations in the 14th century in northern England; several palace-fortresses, considered "extensive, opulent [and] theatrical" date from this period in the region, such as the castles of Bamburgh and Raby. In 1345 the Percys acquired Warkworth Castle, also in Northumberland. Though Alnwick was considered more prestigious, Warkworth became the family's preferred residence.

The Percy family were powerful lords in northern England. Henry Percy, 1st Earl of Northumberland (1341–1408), rebelled against King Richard II and helped dethrone him. The earl and his son Harry Hotspur later rebelled against King Henry IV and after defeating Hotspur in the Battle of Shrewsbury, the king pursued the earl. The castle surrendered under the threat of bombardment in 1403.
During the Wars of the Roses, castles were infrequently attacked and conflict was generally based around combat in the field. Alnwick was one of three castles held by Lancastrian forces in 1461 and 1462, and it was there that the "only practical defence of a private castle" was made according to military historian D. J. Cathcart King. It was held against King Edward IV until its surrender in mid-September 1461 after the Battle of Towton. Re-captured by Sir William Tailboys, during the winter it was surrendered by him to Hastings, Sir John Howard and Sir Ralph Grey of Heton in late July 1462. Grey was appointed captain but surrendered after a sharp siege in the early autumn. King Edward responded with vigour and when the Earl of Warwick arrived in November Queen Margaret and her French advisor, Pierre de Brézé, were forced to sail to Scotland for help. They organised a mainly Scots relief force which, under George Douglas, 4th Earl of Angus and de Brézé, set out on 22 November. Warwick's army, commanded by the experienced Earl of Kent and the recently pardoned Lord Scales, prevented news getting through to the starving garrisons. As a result, the nearby Bamburgh and Dunstanburgh castles soon agreed terms and surrendered but Hungerford and Whittingham held Alnwick until Warwick was forced to withdraw when de Brézé and Angus arrived on 5 January 1463.

The Lancastrians missed a chance to bring Warwick to battle instead being content to retire, leaving behind only a token force which surrendered the next day. By May 1463 Alnwick was in Lancastrian hands for the third time since Towton, betrayed by Grey of Heton who tricked the commander, Sir John Astley. Astley was imprisoned and Hungerford resumed command. After Montagu's triumphs at Hedgeley Moor and Hexham in 1464 Warwick arrived before Alnwick on 23 June and received its surrender next day. By the following decade, the 4th Earl of Northumberland had pledged fealty to Edward IV and the castle was returned to the Percys.

After the execution of Thomas Percy, 7th Earl of Northumberland, in 1572 Alnwick Castle was increasingly uninhabited. The 9th Earl of Northumberland placed his distant cousin, another Thomas, in charge as constable in 1594, but just over a decade later Thomas was killed fleeing the Gunpowder Plot and the earl was imprisoned in the Tower of London, beginning over a century without a significant Percy presence at Alnwick. In 1650, Oliver Cromwell would use the castle to house prisoners following the Battle of Dunbar.

In the second half of the 18th century Robert Adam carried out many alterations, as did James Paine, Daniel Garrett and Capability Brown, all under the orders of the returning Percy family. Elizabeth Seymour and Hugh Smithson were elevated to 1st Duke and Duchess of Northumberland in 1766 by George III, whose restorations at Windsor Castle were partly inspired by the couple's work at Alnwick. The interiors were largely in a Strawberry Hill gothic style not at all typical of Adam's work, which was usually neoclassical, as seen at the Northumberlands' London home, Syon House.

However, in the 19th century Algernon, 4th Duke of Northumberland replaced much of Adam's architecture. Instead, he paid Anthony Salvin £250,000 between 1854 and 1865 to remove the Gothic additions and other architectural work. Salvin is mostly responsible for the kitchen, the Prudhoe Tower, the palatial accommodation and the layout of the inner ward. Some of Adam's work survives, but little or none of it remains in the principal rooms shown to the public, which were redecorated in an opulent Italianate style in the Victorian era by Luigi Canina.

Current use

The current duke and his family live in the castle, but occupy only a part of it. The castle is open to the public throughout the summer. After Windsor Castle, it is the second largest inhabited castle in England. Alnwick is still the tenth-most-visited stately home in England according to the Historic Houses Association, with 195,504 visitors in 2006. This figure has increased significantly in the subsequent decade.

During World War II, the Newcastle Church High School for Girls was evacuated to Alnwick Castle. Since the war parts of the castle have continued being used by two other educational establishments: from 1945 to 1977, as Alnwick College of Education, a teacher training college; and, since 1981, by St. Cloud State University of Minnesota as a branch campus forming part of their International Study Programme.

Special exhibitions are housed in three of the castle's perimeter towers. The Postern Tower, as well as featuring an exhibition on the Dukes of Northumberland and their interest in archaeology, includes frescoes from Pompeii, relics from Ancient Egypt and Romano-British objects. Constable's Tower houses military displays like the Percy Tenantry Volunteers exhibition, local volunteer soldiers raised to repel Napoleon's planned invasion in the period 1798–1814. The Abbot's Tower houses the Regimental Museum of the Royal Northumberland Fusiliers.

An increase in public interest in the castle was generated by its use as a stand-in for the exterior and interior of Hogwarts in the Harry Potter films. Its appearance in the films has helped shape the public imagination regarding what castles should look like. Its condition contrasts with the vast majority of castles in the country, which are ruinous and unfit for habitation.

Construction

The River Aln flows past the north side of the Castle. There is a deep ravine to the south and east, separating the castle from the town. By the 12th century, Alnwick Castle had assumed the general layout which it retains today. It is distinguished as one of the earliest castles in England to be built without a square keep. The castle consists of two main rings of buildings. The inner ring is set around a small courtyard and contains the principal rooms. This structure is at the centre of a large bailey. As the central block was not large enough to contain all the accommodations required in later centuries, a large range of buildings was constructed along the south wall of the bailey. These two main areas of accommodation are connected by a link building. There are towers at regular intervals along the walls of the outer bailey. About a sixth of the bailey wall has been reduced almost to ground level on the bailey side to open up views into the park. Stable and service yards adjoin the castle outside the bailey; these would not have existed when the castle still had a military function.

Alnwick Castle has two parks. Immediately to the north of the castle is a relatively small park straddling the River Aln which was landscaped by Lancelot Brown ("Capability Brown") and Thomas Call in the 18th century; it is known locally as the Pastures. Nearby is the much larger Hulne Park, which contains the remains of Hulne Priory.

The castle is in good repair and used for many purposes. It provides a home for the present Duke and family and offices for Northumberland Estates, which manages the Duke's extensive farming and property holdings.

Alnwick's battlements are surmounted by carved figures. Some of these date from around 1300; historian Matthew Johnson notes that around this time there were several castles in northern England similarly decorated, such as Bothal, Lumley and Raby. However, many of the surviving figures are from the mid-18th century, commissioned by the 1st Duke and Duchess from Stamfordham sculptor James Johnson.

Alnwick Garden

Adjacent to the castle, Jane Percy, Duchess of Northumberland, has initiated the establishment of the Alnwick Garden, a formal garden set around a cascading fountain. It cost £42 million (press release of 7 August 2003). The garden belongs to a charitable trust which is separate from the Northumberland Estates, but the Duke of Northumberland donated the  site and £9 million. The garden is designed by Jacques Wirtz and Peter Wirtz of Wirtz International based in Schoten, Belgium. The first phase of development opened in October 2001, involved the creation of the fountain and initial planting of the gardens. In 2004 a large  'treehouse' complex, including a café, was opened. It is deemed one of the largest treehouses in the world.

In February 2005, a poison garden, growing plants such as cannabis and opium poppy, was added. May 2006 saw the opening of a pavilion and visitor centre designed by Sir Michael Hopkins and Buro Happold which can hold up to 1,000 people.

Filming location 
Alnwick Castle has been used as a setting in many films and television series.
 Films

 1954 Prince Valiant
 1964 Becket
 1971 Mary, Queen of Scots
 1979 Unidentified Flying Oddball
 1982 Ivanhoe
 1990 or 1991 The Timekeeper
 1991 Robin Hood: Prince of Thieves
 1998 Monk Dawson
 1998 Elizabeth
 2001 Harry Potter and the Philosopher's Stone
 2002 Harry Potter and the Chamber of Secrets
 2011 Your Highness
 2017 Transformers: The Last Knight

 Television

 1977 Count Dracula
 1983 The Black Adder
 1984–1986 Robin of Sherwood
 1995 Antiques Roadshow
 1995 The Fast Show
 2005 The Virgin Queen
 2009 Dickinson's Real Deal
 2011 Red or Black?
 2012 Flog It!
 2012 The Hollow Crown
 2014/2015 Downton Abbey

See also
 Castles in Great Britain and Ireland
 List of castles in England

Notes

References

Cockayne's Complete Peerage, (Vescy), Vol. XIIB, pp. 272–274

Further reading

External links

 
 Alnwick Garden
 The Northumberland Fusiliers Museum

Alnwick
Archaeological museums in England
Carriage museums in England
Castles in Northumberland
Country houses in Northumberland
Gardens by Capability Brown
Gardens in Northumberland
Grade I listed buildings in Northumberland
Grade I listed castles
Grade I listed parks and gardens in Northumberland
Historic house museums in Northumberland
History of Northumberland
Motte-and-bailey castles
Percy family residences
Transport museums in England
De Vesci family